Sarıkamış station is a railway station in the town of Sarıkamış, Turkey. The station is serviced by the Eastern Express, operated by the Turkish State Railways, running between Istanbul and Kars. The station was built in 1913 with broad gauge tracks by the Russian Empire. The tracks were converted into standard gauge in 1962.

References

Railway stations in Kars Province
Railway stations opened in 1913
1913 establishments in the Russian Empire
Sarıkamış District